Kathana railway station is a railway station on the Western Railway network in the state of Gujarat, India. Passenger trains start from Kathana railway station.

Major Trains

Following trains start from Kathana railway station:

 59101/02 Kathana - Vadodara Passenger

References

See also
 Anand district

Railway stations in Anand district
Vadodara railway division